Cormac of Mortlach is the third Bishop of Mortlach, Scotland, according to the list of the Aberdeen Registrum. He is known only by name. Skene tried to identify him with Bishop Cormac of Dunkeld, but this argument rests purely on the similarity of an extremely common name. Cormac's successor Nechtan was bishop by at least 1131, when he appears in a charter recorded in the Gaelic notitiae on the margins of the Book of Deer.

Notes

References
 Jackson, Kenneth H. (ed.), The Gaelic Notes in the Book of Deer: The Osborn Bergin Memorial Lecture 1970, (Cambridge, 1972),
 Innes, Cosmo, Registrum episcopatus Aberdonensis : ecclesie Cathedralis Aberdonensis regesta que extant in unum collecta, 2 Vols, (Spalding and Maitland Clubs, 1845), Vol. ii
 Skene, William Forbes, Celtic Scotland: A History of Ancient Alban, 2nd ed., (Edinburgh, 1887), vol. ii

11th-century births
Medieval Gaels from Scotland
12th-century Scottish Roman Catholic bishops
12th-century deaths